The Vsevolozhsk constituency (No.111) is a Russian legislative constituency in Leningrad Oblast. The constituency covers northern Leningrad Oblast and eastern suburbs of Saint Petersburg.

Members elected

Election results

1993

|-
! colspan=2 style="background-color:#E9E9E9;text-align:left;vertical-align:top;" |Candidate
! style="background-color:#E9E9E9;text-align:left;vertical-align:top;" |Party
! style="background-color:#E9E9E9;text-align:right;" |Votes
! style="background-color:#E9E9E9;text-align:right;" |%
|-
|style="background-color:#E9E26E"|
|align=left|Yevgeny Fyodorov
|align=left|Russian Democratic Reform Movement
|
|17.97%
|-
| colspan="5" style="background-color:#E9E9E9;"|
|- style="font-weight:bold"
| colspan="3" style="text-align:left;" | Total
| 
| 100%
|-
| colspan="5" style="background-color:#E9E9E9;"|
|- style="font-weight:bold"
| colspan="4" |Source:
|
|}

1995

|-
! colspan=2 style="background-color:#E9E9E9;text-align:left;vertical-align:top;" |Candidate
! style="background-color:#E9E9E9;text-align:left;vertical-align:top;" |Party
! style="background-color:#E9E9E9;text-align:right;" |Votes
! style="background-color:#E9E9E9;text-align:right;" |%
|-
|style="background-color:#D50000"|
|align=left|Vladimir Grigoryev
|align=left|Communists and Working Russia - for the Soviet Union
|
|10.08%
|-
|style="background-color:#2C299A"|
|align=left|Anatoly Kalinin
|align=left|Congress of Russian Communities
|
|8.09%
|-
|style="background-color:"|
|align=left|Yury Alferov
|align=left|Independent
|
|7.64%
|-
|style="background-color:"|
|align=left|Vitaly Stepanko
|align=left|Our Home – Russia
|
|7.11%
|-
|style="background-color:#F5821F"|
|align=left|Yevgeny Fyodorov (incumbent)
|align=left|Bloc of Independents
|
|6.93%
|-
|style="background-color:"|
|align=left|Valery Shkoldin
|align=left|Independent
|
|6.60%
|-
|style="background-color:"|
|align=left|Svetlana Yurkova
|align=left|Independent
|
|5.53%
|-
|style="background-color:"|
|align=left|Aleksandr Permyakov
|align=left|Independent
|
|5.42%
|-
|style="background-color:"|
|align=left|Vladimir Lebedev
|align=left|Power to the People!
|
|4.20%
|-
|style="background-color:#FF8201"|
|align=left|Lyudmila Chayka
|align=left|Christian-Democratic Union - Christians of Russia
|
|4.11%
|-
|style="background-color:"|
|align=left|Vyacheslav Ulybin
|align=left|Liberal Democratic Party
|
|4.08%
|-
|style="background-color:"|
|align=left|Viktor Denikin
|align=left|Union of Patriots
|
|3.60%
|-
|style="background-color:#DA2021"|
|align=left|Galina Oksyutnik
|align=left|Ivan Rybkin Bloc
|
|3.02%
|-
|style="background-color:"|
|align=left|Aleksey Maksimenkov
|align=left|Independent
|
|2.65%
|-
|style="background-color:#2998D5"|
|align=left|Yevgeny Polyakov
|align=left|Russian All-People's Movement
|
|1.31%
|-
|style="background-color:"|
|align=left|Aleksey Redozubov
|align=left|Independent
|
|1.30%
|-
|style="background-color:#000000"|
|colspan=2 |against all
|
|14.88%
|-
| colspan="5" style="background-color:#E9E9E9;"|
|- style="font-weight:bold"
| colspan="3" style="text-align:left;" | Total
| 
| 100%
|-
| colspan="5" style="background-color:#E9E9E9;"|
|- style="font-weight:bold"
| colspan="4" |Source:
|
|}

1999
A by-election was scheduled after Against all line received the most votes.

|-
! colspan=2 style="background-color:#E9E9E9;text-align:left;vertical-align:top;" |Candidate
! style="background-color:#E9E9E9;text-align:left;vertical-align:top;" |Party
! style="background-color:#E9E9E9;text-align:right;" |Votes
! style="background-color:#E9E9E9;text-align:right;" |%
|-
|style="background-color:"|
|align=left|Olga Borisova
|align=left|Independent
|
|14.54%
|-
|style="background-color:"|
|align=left|Sergey Kyshtymov
|align=left|Independent
|
|12.38%
|-
|style="background-color:#D50000"|
|align=left|Vladimir Grigoryev (incumbent)
|align=left|Communists and Workers of Russia - for the Soviet Union
|
|11.03%
|-
|style="background-color:"|
|align=left|Aleksandr Trafimov
|align=left|Independent
|
|9.40%
|-
|style="background-color:"|
|align=left|Viktor Pleskachevsky
|align=left|Unity
|
|7.21%
|-
|style="background-color:"|
|align=left|Boris Moiseyev
|align=left|Yabloko
|
|5.80%
|-
|style="background-color:"|
|align=left|Aleksandr Lysov
|align=left|Independent
|
|4.75%
|-
|style="background-color:"|
|align=left|Viktor Rybachok
|align=left|Independent
|
|4.23%
|-
|style="background-color:"|
|align=left|Oleg Shelyagov
|align=left|Independent
|
|2.80%
|-
|style="background-color:"|
|align=left|Rashid Ismagilov
|align=left|Independent
|
|2.62%
|-
|style="background-color:"|
|align=left|Valery Grigoryev
|align=left|Liberal Democratic Party
|
|2.12%
|-
|style="background-color:"|
|align=left|Dmitry Yakubovsky
|align=left|Independent
|
|2.03%
|-
|style="background-color:#084284"|
|align=left|Vladislav Kosenko
|align=left|Spiritual Heritage
|
|1.71%
|-
|style="background-color:"|
|align=left|Taras Dzhus
|align=left|Independent
|
|1.34%
|-
|style="background-color:#F1043D"|
|align=left|Valery Gerasimov
|align=left|Socialist Party
|
|0.52%
|-
|style="background-color:"|
|align=left|Aleksandr Vtulkin
|align=left|Independent
|
|0.48%
|-
|style="background-color:#020266"|
|align=left|Vadim Raskovalov
|align=left|Russian Socialist Party
|
|0.33%
|-
|style="background-color:#000000"|
|colspan=2 |against all
|
|14.73%
|-
| colspan="5" style="background-color:#E9E9E9;"|
|- style="font-weight:bold"
| colspan="3" style="text-align:left;" | Total
| 
| 100%
|-
| colspan="5" style="background-color:#E9E9E9;"|
|- style="font-weight:bold"
| colspan="4" |Source:
|
|}

2000

|-
! colspan=2 style="background-color:#E9E9E9;text-align:left;vertical-align:top;" |Candidate
! style="background-color:#E9E9E9;text-align:left;vertical-align:top;" |Party
! style="background-color:#E9E9E9;text-align:right;" |Votes
! style="background-color:#E9E9E9;text-align:right;" |%
|-
|style="background-color:"|
|align=left|Aleksandr Nevzorov
|align=left|Independent
|
|38.07%
|-
|style="background-color:"|
|align=left|Yury Fedotov
|align=left|Independent
|
|17.82%
|-
|style="background-color:"|
|align=left|Yury Trusov
|align=left|Independent
|
|6.81%
|-
|style="background-color:"|
|align=left|Yury Sevenard
|align=left|Independent
|
|6.15%
|-
|style="background-color:"|
|align=left|Anatoly Smirnov
|align=left|Independent
|
|5.03%
|-
|style="background-color:"|
|align=left|Vladimir Grigoryev
|align=left|Independent
|
|4.11%
|-
|style="background-color:"|
|align=left|Gennady Seleznev
|align=left|Independent
|
|3.49%
|-
|style="background-color:"|
|align=left|Mikhail Glushchenko
|align=left|Independent
|
|1.44%
|-
|style="background-color:"|
|align=left|Galina Sharova
|align=left|Independent
|
|1.18%
|-
|style="background-color:"|
|align=left|Oleg Shelyagov
|align=left|Independent
|
|0.88%
|-
|style="background-color:"|
|align=left|Anton Volkov
|align=left|Independent
|
|0.71%
|-
|style="background-color:"|
|align=left|Rudolf Kagramanov
|align=left|Independent
|
|0.36%
|-
|style="background-color:"|
|align=left|Vyacheslav Shevchenko
|align=left|Independent
|
|0.20%
|-
|style="background-color:#000000"|
|colspan=2 |against all
|
|11.55%
|-
| colspan="5" style="background-color:#E9E9E9;"|
|- style="font-weight:bold"
| colspan="3" style="text-align:left;" | Total
| 
| 100%
|-
| colspan="5" style="background-color:#E9E9E9;"|
|- style="font-weight:bold"
| colspan="4" |Source:
|
|}

2003

|-
! colspan=2 style="background-color:#E9E9E9;text-align:left;vertical-align:top;" |Candidate
! style="background-color:#E9E9E9;text-align:left;vertical-align:top;" |Party
! style="background-color:#E9E9E9;text-align:right;" |Votes
! style="background-color:#E9E9E9;text-align:right;" |%
|-
|style="background-color:"|
|align=left|Aleksandr Nevzorov (incumbent)
|align=left|Independent
|
|18.58%
|-
|style="background-color:#1042A5"|
|align=left|Zalina Medoyeva
|align=left|Union of Right Forces
|
|13.97%
|-
|style="background-color:"|
|align=left|Vyacheslav Arutyunov
|align=left|Independent
|
|8.65%
|-
|style="background-color:"|
|align=left|Olga Borisova
|align=left|Independent
|
|8.24%
|-
|style="background-color:"|
|align=left|Anatoly Kontashev
|align=left|Independent
|
|7.05%
|-
|style="background-color:"|
|align=left|Irina Tomason
|align=left|Independent
|
|5.53%
|-
|style="background-color:"|
|align=left|Damir Shadayev
|align=left|Liberal Democratic Party
|
|5.52%
|-
|style="background-color:"|
|align=left|Mikhail Aleksandrov
|align=left|Rodina
|
|5.52%
|-
|style="background-color:#D50000"|
|align=left|Yury Terentyev
|align=left|Russian Communist Workers Party — Russian Party of Communists
|
|5.39%
|-
|style="background-color:"|
|align=left|Yelena Slepko
|align=left|Agrarian Party
|
|2.97%
|-
|style="background-color:"|
|align=left|Nikolay Prokudin
|align=left|Yabloko
|
|2.64%
|-
|style="background-color:#164C8C"|
|align=left|Viktor Stepanov
|align=left|United Russian Party Rus'
|
|0.68%
|-
|style="background-color:#000000"|
|colspan=2 |against all
|
|13.58%
|-
| colspan="5" style="background-color:#E9E9E9;"|
|- style="font-weight:bold"
| colspan="3" style="text-align:left;" | Total
| 
| 100%
|-
| colspan="5" style="background-color:#E9E9E9;"|
|- style="font-weight:bold"
| colspan="4" |Source:
|
|}

2016

|-
! colspan=2 style="background-color:#E9E9E9;text-align:left;vertical-align:top;" |Candidate
! style="background-color:#E9E9E9;text-align:left;vertical-align:top;" |Party
! style="background-color:#E9E9E9;text-align:right;" |Votes
! style="background-color:#E9E9E9;text-align:right;" |%
|-
|style="background-color: " |
|align=left|Vladimir Drachev
|align=left|United Russia
|100,133
|47.64%
|-
|style="background-color:" |
|align=left|Andrey Lebedev
|align=left|Liberal Democratic Party
|23,415
|11.14%
|-
|style="background-color: " |
|align=left|Valeria Kovalenko
|align=left|A Just Russia
|22,260
|10.59%
|-
|style="background-color: " |
|align=left|Vladimir Taymazov
|align=left|Communist Party
|13,415
|6.38%
|-
|style="background:"|
|align=left|Lyudmila Savina
|align=left|Communists of Russia
|10,074
|4.79%
|-
|style="background-color: " |
|align=left|Aleksey Etmanov
|align=left|Yabloko
|8,569
|3.48%
|-
|style="background:" |
|align=left|Vladimir Popov
|align=left|Party of Growth
|7,322
|3.48%
|-
|style="background:" |
|align=left|Larisa Larkina
|align=left|The Greens
|5,971
|2.84%
|-
|style="background-color: " |
|align=left|Anastasia Zatochnaya
|align=left|Rodina
|5,791
|2.75%
|-
|style="background-color: " |
|align=left|Tatyana Lepetenina
|align=left|Civic Platform
|3,100
|1.47%
|-
| colspan="5" style="background-color:#E9E9E9;"|
|- style="font-weight:bold"
| colspan="3" style="text-align:left;" | Total
| 210,208
| 100%
|-
| colspan="5" style="background-color:#E9E9E9;"|
|- style="font-weight:bold"
| colspan="4" |Source:
|
|}

2021

|-
! colspan=2 style="background-color:#E9E9E9;text-align:left;vertical-align:top;" |Candidate
! style="background-color:#E9E9E9;text-align:left;vertical-align:top;" |Party
! style="background-color:#E9E9E9;text-align:right;" |Votes
! style="background-color:#E9E9E9;text-align:right;" |%
|-
|style="background-color: " |
|align=left|Svetlana Zhurova
|align=left|United Russia
|101,200
|43.20%
|-
|style="background-color: " |
|align=left|Vadim Budeyev
|align=left|Communist Party
|40,597
|17.33%
|-
|style="background-color: " |
|align=left|Valeria Kovalenko
|align=left|A Just Russia — For Truth
|20,929
|8.93%
|-
|style="background-color: " |
|align=left|Andrey Lebedev
|align=left|Liberal Democratic Party
|13,249
|5.66%
|-
|style="background-color: " |
|align=left|Aleksey Shurshikov
|align=left|New People
|12,131
|5.18%
|-
|style="background-color: " |
|align=left|Vasily Ivanov
|align=left|Party of Pensioners
|11,726
|5.01%
|-
|style="background-color: " |
|align=left|Lyudmila Savina
|align=left|Communists of Russia
|9,100
|3.88%
|-
|style="background-color: " |
|align=left|Anton Gordyuk
|align=left|Yabloko
|6,468
|2.76%
|-
|style="background-color: " |
|align=left|Valery Shinkarenko
|align=left|Rodina
|4,174
|1.78%
|-
|style="background-color: " |
|align=left|Aleksandr Gabitov
|align=left|Civic Platform
|3,141
|1.34%
|-
| colspan="5" style="background-color:#E9E9E9;"|
|- style="font-weight:bold"
| colspan="3" style="text-align:left;" | Total
| 234,241
| 100%
|-
| colspan="5" style="background-color:#E9E9E9;"|
|- style="font-weight:bold"
| colspan="4" |Source:
|
|}

Notes

References

Russian legislative constituencies
Politics of Leningrad Oblast